Ezza South is a local government area located in Ebonyi state on south-eastern Nigeria. Its headquarters is Onueke, which also serve as a central unification town for the Ezza nation as well as headquarters of Ebonyi Central senatorial zone. It was created on October 1, 1996 amongst other local government areas in the then new Ebonyi state by the military government of General Sani Abacha. Ezza South prior to its creation was part of old Ezza Local government area. The people are predominantly of Igbo stock. They speak Ezza dialect and the central Igbo language. Their major occupations are farming and trading as well as emerging civil servant class.
It has an area of 324 km and a population of 133,625 at the 2006 census.

The postal code of the area is 482.

References

Local Government Areas in Ebonyi State